Methyl-CpG-binding domain protein 1 is a protein that in humans is encoded by the MBD1 gene. The protein encoded by MBD1 binds to methylated sequences in DNA, and thereby influences transcription.  It binds to a variety of methylated sequences, and appears to mediate repression of gene expression.  It has been shown to play a role in chromatin modification through interaction with the histone H3K9 methyltransferase SETDB1. H3K9me3 is a repressive modification.

Function 

DNA methylation is the major modification of eukaryotic genomes and plays an essential role in mammalian development. Human proteins MECP2, MBD1, MBD2, MBD3, and MBD4 comprise a family of nuclear proteins related by the presence in each of a methyl-CpG binding domain (MBD). Each of these proteins, with the exception of MBD3, is capable of binding specifically to methylated DNA. MECP2, MBD1 and MBD2 can also repress transcription from methylated gene promoters.  Five transcript variants of the MBD1 are generated by alternative splicing resulting in protein isoforms that contain one MBD domain, two to three cysteine-rich (CXXC) domains, and some differences in the COOH terminus.  All five transcript variants repress transcription from methylated promoters; in addition, variants with three CXXC domains also repress unmethylated promoter activity.  MBD1 and MBD2 map very close to each other on chromosome 18q21.

Interactions 

MBD1 has been shown to interact with ATF7IP, CBX5, CHAF1A and SUV39H1.

References

Further reading 

 
 
 
 
 
 
 
 
 
 
 
 
 
 
 
 
 

DNA